Whitney H. Westerfield (born November 29, 1980) is an American politician and a Republican member of the Kentucky Senate representing District 3 since January 8, 2013. In 2015, Westerfield was the unsuccessful Republican nominee for Attorney General of Kentucky, losing to Democrat Andy Beshear by a margin of 0.2 percent.

Education
Westerfield earned his BS in communication from the University of Kentucky in 2003, and his JD from Southern Illinois University Carbondale in 2006.

Early career

In 2012, Westerfield challenged District 3 incumbent Democratic Senator Joey Pendleton, Westerfield was unopposed for the May 22, 2012 Republican primary and won the November 6, 2012 general election with 18,457 votes (50.4%) against Pendleton.  The American Conservative Union gave him a 90% evaluation in 2017.

In 2015, Westerfield ran for Attorney General of Kentucky. He lost to Democrat Andy Beshear by a very narrow margin. 
Beshear defeated Westerfield by a margin of 0.2 percent, getting 50.1% of the vote to Westerfield's 49.9%. The margin was approximately 2,000 votes.

In 2019, Westerfield ran for Kentucky Supreme Court District 1. He lost the general election to fellow Republican Christopher Shea Nickell.

In 2020, Westerfield ran unopposed in the primary, and drew a Libertarian Party opponent in the General, but was re-elected with nearly 80% of the vote (29,640 to 8,157).

Current career
Westerfield serves as the chairman of the Senate Judiciary Committee. Senator Westerfield also serves as a member on the Veterans, Military Affairs and Public Protection Committee; the Agriculture Committee; the Natural Resources and Energy Committee; the Child Welfare Oversight and Advisory Committee; the Tobacco Settlement Agreement Fund Oversight Committee; the Budget Review Subcommittee on Justice and Judiciary; and serves as co-chair of the Juvenile Justice Oversight Council.  Westerfield serves as a Senate member on a new (2021) Commission on Race and Access to Opportunity, attached to the Kentucky legislature's administrative agency, the Legislative Research Commission.  He formerly served on both the Legislative Oversight and Investigations Committee (formerly known as the Program Review and Investigations Committee) and the Senate Bill 192 (heroin and controlled substance-related legislation) Oversight Committee.

Westerfield serves as a member in several approved caucuses including the Kentucky Sportsmen's Caucus (Member), Western Kentucky Caucus (Member), the Tennessee Valley Authority Caucus (Member), the Pro-Life Caucus (Member), the Aerospace/Aviation Caucus (Member), and the Kentucky Nonprofit Caucus (Member).

Westerfield is a lifelong resident of Christian County, Kentucky, and presently maintains a private law practice in after serving over five years as an Assistant Commonwealth's Attorney. He also operates a commercial drone photography/videography company, known as Flightdubs, LLC (www.flightdubs.com) serving clients across the Commonwealth and Tennessee.

References

External links 
 Senate District 3: Senator Whitney Westerfield (R) at Kentucky Legislature
 WhitneyWesterfield.com (campaign site)
 Whitney H. Westerfield at Project Vote Smart
 Whitney Westerfield at Ballotpedia
 Whitney H. Westerfield at the National Institute on Money in State Politics

1980 births
Baptists from Kentucky
Living people
Republican Party Kentucky state senators
People from Hopkinsville, Kentucky
Place of birth missing (living people)
Southern Illinois University School of Law alumni
University of Kentucky alumni
21st-century American politicians